The Gran Galà del Calcio AIC is an event organised by the Italian Footballers' Association (AIC) in order to reward players, managers and referees who have been considered to have performed the best over the previous Serie A season. The winners of the awards are chosen by the league's footballers. It replaced the Oscar del Calcio AIC in 2011, which had occurred since 1997.

List of awards

Current
Serie A Team of the Year
Serie A Footballer of the Year
Serie A Coach of the Year
Serie B Footballer of the Year
Serie A Goalkeeper of the Year
Serie A Referee of the Year
Serie A Football Club of the Year
Serie A Women's Team of the Year
Serie A Female Footballer of the Year

Discontinued
Serie A Italian Footballer of the Year
Serie A Foreign Footballer of the Year
Serie A Young Footballer of the Year
Serie A Defender of the Year

Special awards
The following prizes have been awarded only in one or a few editions.

Critics' Award

Lifetime Achievement Award

Loyalty Award

Serie A Best Team

Serie A Best Young Revelation

Serie A Fair Play Award

Serie A Men's Goal of the Year

Serie A Women's Goal of the Year

Serie A Goalscorer of the Year

Serie A Most Loved Player

Serie A Player of the Century

See also
Serie A Team of the Year
Guerin d'Oro
Panchina d'Oro
Serie A Awards

References

External links
 Official website
 List of Oscar del Calcio winners on the AIC official website
 List of Gran Galà del Calcio winners on the AIC official website

Serie A trophies and awards
 
Awards established in 1997